The Undergraduates of Canadian Research Intensive Universities (UCRU) is an alliance of students' unions in Canada. Their common objective is to protect the interests and advocate on behalf of over 240,000 undergraduate university students from Canada's largest research intensive universities (U15), and to provide research and recommendations to the government on how to improve post-secondary education in Canada. The UCRU began as an informal association called ADVOCAN, and was formalized and rebranded in late 2017.

Membership 

The nine member associations of the UCRU are:

 Waterloo Undergraduate Student Association (WUSA) – University of Waterloo 
Western University’s Student Council (USC) – Western University
McMaster Students Union (MSU) – McMaster University
 The Alma Mater Society (AMS) – Queen's University 
University of Toronto Student Union (UTSU) – University of Toronto
 The Alma Mater Society of UBC Vancouver (AMS-UBC) – University of British Columbia
 University of Saskatchewan Students’ Union (USSU) – University of Saskatchewan
Student's Society of McGill University (SSMU) -- McGill University
 The University of Ottawa's Students' Union (UOSU) - University of Ottawa

Advocacy Topics 

 Indigenous Students
 International Students
 Canada Federal Student Loans Program
 Undergraduate Research Funding

External links 

Official website

See also 

 Canadian Alliance of Student Associations (CASA)
 Canadian Federation of Students (CFS)

References 

 
Groups of students' unions
2017 establishments in Ontario